Leptonotus is a genus of pipefishes of the family Syngnathidae. The name is derived from the Greek leptos meaning "thin" and noton meaning "back".

Species
The currently recognized species in this genus are:
 Leptonotus blainvilleanus (Eydoux & Gervais, 1837) (deep-bodied pipefish)
 Leptonotus elevatus (F. W. Hutton, 1872) (high-body pipefish)
 Leptonotus norae (Waite, 1910) (longsnout pipefish)
Leptonotus vincentae Luzzatto & Estalles, 2019

References

 
Marine fish genera
Taxa named by Johann Jakob Kaup